The cinema of Yemen consists of two Yemeni films as of 2008. Released in 2005, A New Day in Old Sana'a deals with a young man struggling between whether to go ahead with a traditional marriage or go with the woman he loves.

In August 2008, Yemen’s Interior Minister Mutaher al-Masri supported the launch of a new feature film to educate the public about the consequences of Islamist extremism. The Losing Bet was produced by Fadl al-Olfi. The plot follows two Yemeni jihadis, who return from years living abroad. They are sent home by an Al Qaeda mastermind to recruit new members and carry out deadly operations in Yemen.

Yemeni films
 "The burdened" (2023)
 10 Days Before the Wedding (2018)
 Yemen: The Silent War (2018)
 The Mulberry House (Yemen/Syria/Egypt/UK/UAE; 2013)
 Karama Has No Walls (Yemen/UAE; 2012)
 The Losing Bet (2008)
 A New Day in Old Sana'a (2005)

Films shot in Yemen
 The Mulberry House (Yemen/Syria/Egypt/UK/UAE; 2013)
 Karama Has No Walls (Yemen/UAE; 2012)
 The English Sheik and the Yemeni Gentleman (American; 2000)
 Il fiore delle mille e una notte (Italian; 1974) 
 Le Mura di Sana (Italian short; 1964)
 Le Schiave Esistono Ancora (Italian; 1964)

List of Yemeni directors

 Bader Ben Hirsi
 Osama Khaled
 Sara Ishaq
 Khadija al-Salami
 Sufian Abulohom
 Yousef Assabahi
 Amr Gamal

See also
 Cinema of the Middle East
 Cinema of the world

References

External links
 Interview with Bader Ben Hirsi
 Article about Yemen's cinemas
 Article about the 'Rules of Engagement' controversy
 Gulf News article about 'A New Day in Old Sana'a'
 Interview with Yemeni actress Najla Atef
 Article about 'A New Day in Old Sana'a'
 Interview with Bader Ben Hirsi
 Review of 'A New Day in Old Sana'a'
 IMDB entry for Yemen 
 'Yemen Through Films' on Yemen Times

 
Yemeni culture